Old North Church (ONC) is in Sierra Madre, California and is a historic landmark building built in 1890, one of the oldest churches and buildings in Sierra Madre. The Old North Church is owned by it builder Sierra Madre Congregational Church, called First Congregational Church of Sierra Madre at the time of completion. It is site #50 on Sierra Madre designated historical landmarks list. There are forty-eight properties listed on Sierra Madre's Designated Historical Properties List. In September 2018 Sierra Madre Congregational Church changed its name to Christ Church Sierra Madre.

History
The Old North Church was constructed by hand with local wood. It is located on the north side of the current Sierra Madre Blvd at Hermosa. In 1890 Sierra Madre Blvd was a dirt street called Central Avenue. Old North Church is currently owned by its builder, Sierra Madre Congregational Church. The Old North Church is closely linked with the early settlement of Sierra Madre.  The community of Sierra Madre was established in the fall of 1881. Sierra Madre Congregational Church started as a Sunday School class in February 1882. Without a building of its own, the church originally met in the city's original 1882 one-room schoolhouse at the corner of Hermosa and Live Oak, now called Orange Grove. To use the schoolhouse as a church on Sunday mornings, the pump organ, hymnbooks, and winter firewood were transported to the schoolhouse by the attendees. The following years the Church met in the original City Hall at the corner Baldwin and Central Ave (Sierra Madre), then the original city library (1889), located at the current library site.  With the completion of the Old North Church in 1890, the church had its own meeting spot. The first service was held on August 17, 1890 and a formal dedication was held December 14, 1890. The land for the old North Church was donated by C.E. Cook and W.S. Andrews. Congregational Church of Sierra Madre was officially established on March 27, 1886, as a nondenominational church congregational church, with 13 founding members, called First Congregational Church of Sierra Madre then. One of the 13 founding members was Mrs. Annetta M. Carter (1846-1937), wife of the city founder Nathaniel Coburn Carter (1840-1904). From 1908 to 1910 the Old North Church was expanded with the addition of new meeting rooms, a kitchen and bathrooms. Also in 1910, a furnace was installed to replace the wood-burning stove.

The Church's second, and the current, main building was built across the street. Construction of the new building started in 1926 with Pritchard Hall and was completed in 1928 with the new sanctuary dedicated on June 17, 1928. The sanctuary cornerstone was laid on Feb. 19, 1928. The 1928 Church building is also a Sierra Madre designated historical landmark, as site #39. Having outgrown the Old North Church in the mid-1920s, the Congregational Church of Sierra Madre built a new stone Church in a Romanesque Revival architecture style, designed by Marsh, Smith, & Powell. Later after the move, the Old North Church was rented to the First Church of the Nazarene in 1939, then purchased by them in 1942. After the Church of the Nazarene outgrew the Old North Church, it was sold back to Sierra Madre Congregational Church in 1976. Congregational Church purchased back the Old North Church for the use of its youth and children, its current role.  Sierra Madre's Cub Scouts Pack 373, Boy Scouts Troop 373, and Troop 373G a Female Scouts BSA troop, meetings are held in the Old North Church. Troop 373 was founded in the Old North Church in 1924. Cub Scouts Pack 373 was started in 1971. Troop 373 was one of the founders of the Sierra Madre Fourth of July parade that then ran from historic Sierra Madre Memorial Park (across the street from the ONC) to historic Sierra Madre Pioneer Cemetery. Troop 373G started in 2022, to provide scouting skills and leadership opportunities to older girls.

The Old North Church survived the 1991 Sierra Madre earthquake relatively undamaged. The 1928 building had damage to the bell tower, which was torn down brick by brick and rebuilt.  The original ONC bell tower was built with a barn shaped roof, modeled after a Dutch church in Holland. Later the Church of the Nazarene changed the bell tower to have a more classic pointed spire. The bell tower housed the 1893 bell weighing 517 pounds, in 1928 the bell was moved to the new south bell tower.

In 1890 Old North Church attendees had to walk, ride a horse or ride in a horse buggy. In January 1906 the Pacific Electric street car was installed and rolled in front of the Old North Church, on the Sierra Madre Line, each day from January 1, 1906, till service ended on October 6, 1950.

Mrs. Annetta M. Carter (Feb, 10, 1846-Sept. 24, 1937), wife of Nathaniel Coburn Carter (Jan. 24, 1840 - Sept. 2, 1904), was key founder of Sierra Madre Congregational Church. Nathaniel and Annetta married in Feb. of 1864 and had 5 children: Florence, (now Mrs. William H. Mead); Arthur N. (b1868), Julia F., Anita E. (the first child born in the Sierra Madre, (b1883, m1910 to Holt R Gregory) and Phillip C (b1885). Annetta M. Pierce (Carter) and Nathaniel both were natives of Lowell, Massachusetts, Nathaniel came to California for his health in 1871. In February 1881, Nathaniel Carter purchased the original 1103 acres that comprised the new city of Sierra Madre. The land was acquired in three purchases: 845 acres of Rancho Santa Anita from Lucky Baldwin, 108 acres from the Southern Pacific Railroad Company and 150 acres from John Richardson (1811-Aug. 9, 1884). With no church in the new small town Annetta Carter helped form the worship group in 1882 that became Sierra Madre Congregational Church. The ONC bell was made and installed in 1893, and has the quote on it "Let him who hears come." The bell was made by Meneely Bell Foundry, Troy, NY. The bell was presented to the Church by Mr. A. S. Bixby, from Bixby Knolls, Long Beach. The bell was used for Sunday services and funerals, but also had a civic duty, to alert the all-volunteer Fire Department.

The original 1904 Pastor's parsonage house was on the north side of Central Avenue (about 127 W. Sierra Madre Boulevard), but as the city grew the house was now on a busy street, so in 1923 the parsonage was moved to Hermosa, just south of the main Church building.

Just to the west of the Old North Church are two other historic buildings: a 1919 Old Mortuary (was Ripple Mortuary, now called the New Life Center) and the 1915 Caretaker American Craftsman home (now called the Hospitality House). Both structures were purchased by the Church in 1986.

The 1928 sanctuary has stained glass windows that were given as memorials. The north side of the sanctuary has four Apostles windows and on the south side are the four Prophets windows. The sanctuary east and west walls have two large windows, the east an the Angel window with the verse "Glory to God in the Highest." and the circular west window is "Christ the Teacher," that was given by the Women's Society and dedicated all the children of Sierra Madre. The lower south widows were a gift from Dick and Dotty Anderson in 2008. Memorial chimes were installed in 1944 into the tower, these played on the hour.

In 1971 Sierra Madre Congregational Church and Bethany Church started the Sierra Madre Christmas Candlelight Walk. The first Candlelight Procession was led by Pastor Bob Vander Zaag of Bethany Church and Rev. Richard Anderson of Sierra Madre Congregational Church.

In September 2018 Sierra Madre Congregational Church changed its name to Christ Church Sierra Madre.

Gallery

Notable pastors
Marquis (Marcus) Lafayette Gordon MD (1843-1900), pastor 1886 to 1887. First pastor, part-time. A medical missionary to Kyoto, Japan. He was in Sierra Madre for one year with his wife Agnes and four children.
Lucien Haskell Frary, (1839-1903) pastor from 1887 to 1888 
Ephraim E. P. Abbott, (1841-1919) pastor from 1888 to 1898.
W. H. Stubbins, (Rev. William Henry Stubbins 1869–1946) pastor 1898 to 1900.
 Rev. Charles S. Rich, (1870-1913) pastor from 1902 to 1903.
 Dr. James M. Campbell D. D., (1840-1926) pastor from 1903 to 1912
William H. Hannaford pastor 1912, 1914-16
Fred Staff, (?-1925) Pastor from 1913 to 1914 and again from 1923 to Nov. 1925, from 1914 to 1916 he returned to Sweden, his native country. Died while pastor. He is honored in SMCC's Fred Staff room. Came from First Congregational Church of Grand Rapids, Wisconsin.
 Rev. C. C. Wilson, pastor 1914 to 1920.
 Rev. W. J. Thompson (Rev. Dr. William J. Thompson), pastor from March 1920 to 1923 (his last church to pastor), from Sheffield came to the US in 1910, later was president of United Amateur Press Association of America.
 Arthur O. Pritchard, pastor at the time of the opening of the new building in 1928, Pritchard Hall is named after him. Pastor from 1926 to 1940. From Hollywood Congregational Church
 George Lindsay pastor from March 1956 to 1964, 20th pastor, (no pastor till Howell)
Rev. David Howell Jr. pastor 1966 to 1968.
 Richard (Dick) Anderson, Sr. Pastor for 40 years, from 1968 to 2008.  He is honored in SMCC's Anderson Terrance.
James J. Stewart Jr., associate pastor, then pastor at Journey Covenant Church, Redondo Beach, California.
Ken Cromeenes, Pastor of Administration 1980s to 2000s.
John H. Reed, associate pastor 1986 to 1996, former Army Chaplain.
Tim Thompson, associate pastor (May 2002 – October 2008) and founder of The Church Works.
Rick Bundschuh youth pastor 1978, author of Deep Like Me: (Or Another Failed Attempt to Walk on Water).
Jim Zeilenga, pastor of assimilation and outreach from April 1987 to March 2004. then pastor at Valencia Hills Community Church, then Desert Springs Baptist Church.
 Larry Mills, minister of Christian education, 2000s
John Eldredge associate pastor 1983–1988, now author, counselor, and lecturer on Christianity.
Brian Anderson, youth pastor 1987–1990, now Pastor at Mission Hills Church.
Steve Wiebe, youth pastor 1992–1999, now founder and director of Neighborhood Urban Family Center.
Rick Mumford, youth pastor 2004 to 2006, then with KC Metro, then Search Ministries.
Johnny Johnston, youth pastor 2006–2010. now Jennersville Campus Pastor, Willowdale Chapel, Kennett Square, PA
Roger Van Spronsen, associate pastor 1988–2009, now pastor at Life Christian Fellowship.
Paul S. Beck, Sr. pastor for six years, 2008 to 2014. Now Senior PastorSenior Pastor at Loudonville Community Church
Steve Miller, Intentional Interim Senior Pastor of Sierra Madre Congregational Church, 2014 to Nov. 2016.
Gavin Rutherford Ortlund, associate pastor (October 2014 to Nov. 2016) and former youth Pastor at SMCC (Oct. 2010-Oct 2014). Son of Raymond C. Ortlund, Jr. and Grandson of Raymond C. Ortlund Sr. Now Senior Pastor at First Baptist Church of Ojai
Abel Burke, youth Pastor at SMCC for 6 years (2012 to March 2018), now Pastor at Ambassador Church and Redemption Bible Church San Dimas
 Dr. Hugh Ross, pastor for outreach and apologetics from 1971 to present (part-time starting in 1987, Emeritus starting 2021), Also see Reasons to Believe.
Josh Swanson, Sr. Pastor, Dec. 2017 to present, previously with Hope Church in Albuquerque, NM. (Name changed to Christ Church Sierra Madre)
 Robert Covolo, Pastor of Theological Formation & Missional Engagement and Director of Pastoral Residency and Internship Program. 2018 to present.
 Justin Sapp Director Communications Director, Creative Director, (also a Youth Pastor), 2018 to 2022.
Wisdom Mira-Wee, Pastor Resident, Youth Ministry, 2021 to present. 
Jonathan Wee, Pastor Resident, Outreach  Ministry, 2021 to present. 
John Sagherian, Pastoral Resident, Youth Ministry, 2021 to present.

See also
 Episcopal Church of the Ascension (Sierra Madre, California)
 Greater Los Angeles Area Council

References

External links
Christ Church Sierra Madre, (formally Sierra Madre Congregational Church official) web site
facebook.com, Christ Church Sierra Madre
Jemaat Kristen Indonesia Anugerah Church, Church in the Old North Church, Sunday afternoons
 JKI Anugerah - Grace Indonesian Christian Fellowship

Churches in Los Angeles County, California
 
Churches completed in 1890
Churches completed in 1928